Mongi Landhili (born 15 December 1945) is a Tunisian boxer. He competed in the men's lightweight event at the 1968 Summer Olympics.

References

1945 births
Living people
Tunisian male boxers
Olympic boxers of Tunisia
Boxers at the 1968 Summer Olympics
Lightweight boxers
20th-century Tunisian people